Hosen (lit. Strength) is a moshav in northern Israel. Located near Ma'alot-Tarshiha, it falls under the jurisdiction of Ma'ale Yosef Regional Council.

History

The village was established in 1949 by members of Herut on land which had belonged to the depopulated Palestinian village of Suhmata.

References

Moshavim
Populated places established in 1949
Populated places in Northern District (Israel)
1949 establishments in Israel